Frank Hutcheson (22 November 1907 – 7 March 1969) was  a former Australian rules footballer who played with St Kilda in the Victorian Football League (VFL).

Notes

External links 
		

1907 births
1969 deaths
Australian rules footballers from Victoria (Australia)
St Kilda Football Club players
Oakleigh Football Club players